Famous or important Yemenis include:

Yemeni early diaspora
 Ghassanids, tribes consisting of more than 50 families that migrated north to the Levant
 Lakhmids
 Banu Judham
 Kindah
 Sakasic, were a Himyarite tribe that settled Northern Egypt around 3rd century AD. They settled the ancient town of Bubastis in Egypt giving it its modern name Zaqaziq after the name of their Yemeni Tribe Sakasic. Also its one of Egypt provinces.
 Banu Quda'a, were a Himyarite tribe that was exiled from Yemen following the trials of the Lakhmids and they settled The Southern part of the Lakhmid Kingdom in the Samawaregion.
 Banu Amela, were the first South Arabian tribe to settle The Southern part of Mt Lebanon later known as Jabal Amil, possibly as early as the 1st millennium BC.
 Banu Muayiya ruled much of northern Arabia and Bahrain. They were mostly affiliated with Himyar and declined after its fall.
 Banu al-Harith, settled in Najran

Scholars and academics
 Amat Al Alim Alsoswa, first female journalist Yemen Arab Republic, first female deputy minister, first female ambassador and minister in the Republic of Yemen
 Al Kindi, from Al Kindah tribe of Qaht
 Abdul Aziz bin Hars bin Asad Yemeni Tamimi (816–944), famous Sufi of Junaidia order
 Abu Al Fazal Abdul Wahid Yemeni Tamimi (842–1034), famous Sufi of Junaidia order
 Abu Muhammad Al-hasan Ibn Ahmad Al-hamdani (893–945), geographer, poet, grammarian, historian, and astronomer
 Abdullah Al-Baradouni (1929–1999)
 Ibn Khaldun (1332–1406), sociologist, philosopher and historian
 Grand Muhaddis Imam Syed Fahal Al-Hassani,Yemen Based Pakistani (Imam of Fatmids dynasty)
 Muhammad al-Gharsi
 Muqbil bin Hadi al-Wadi'i, Yemeni Muslim cleric, founder of the Dammaj madrasa
 Muhammad ash-Shawkani, Yemeni Sunni Salafi scholar
 Raufa Hassan al-Sharki, professor, journalist and founder of women's studies program at Sana'a University

Athletes
 Isra Girgrah, female five-time world champion
 Nashwan Al-Harazi, Golden gymnast
 Ali Raymi, boxer and colonel in the Yemeni Armed Forces

Filmmakers
 Boushra Almutawakel, photographer
 Bader Ben Hirsi, Award-winning British Yemeni director and writer, made Yemen's first full-length feature film, A New Day in Old Sana'a
 Khadija al-Salami

Musicians
 Mohammed Abdu
 Ayoob Tarish Absey
 Arwa
 Shoshana Damari (1923–2006), Israeli singer
 Dana International (born 1972), Israeli singer
 Inbar Bakal (half Yemeni)
 Ahmed Fathi
Balqees Fathi
 Zion Golan
 Ofra Haza
 Boaz Mauda
 Achinoam Nini (better known as Noa)
 Rosana
 Harel Skaat (half Yemeni)
 Jade Thirlwall (quarter Yemeni)
 Fouad Abdulwahid (singer)

Writers and journalists 
 Ramziya al-Iryani, novelist, diplomat and women's rights activist.
 Sumaya Ali Raja, journalist and first woman presidential candidate for post-revolution Yemen.
 Zahra Rahmat Allah, short story writer and journalist.
Hind Aleryani, journalist and social activist.
Azizah Abd Allah Abu Lahum, novelist and women's rights activist.

Entrepreneurs
 Mohammed bin Awad bin Laden, founder of the construction conglomerate Saudi Binladin Group and the father of Osama Bin Laden
 Salem bin Mahfouz, founder of the National Commercial Bank of Saudi Arabia and the father of Khalid bin Mahfouz
 [[S

 Zahra Al-Harazi, founder of Foundry Communications in Calgary, Canada
 Abdulla Al-Omeri, businessman, founder of an egg farm and local and national businesses

Social workers and activists 
 Amal Basha, considered "Yemen's most famous feminist."
 Jamala al-Baidhani, activist for human and civil rights for women and the disabled.
 Nujood Ali, activist against child brides and forced marriage.
 Fatima al-Aqel, activist for women with blindness.
 Shada Nasser, attorney for Nujood Ali

Leaders and politicians

Historical figures
 Sharifa Fatima, Zaydi chief in 15th-century Yemen
 Al-Khayzuran (died 789), wife of the Abbasid Caliph Al-Mahdi and mother of both Caliphs Al-Hadi and the most famous Abbasid Caliph Harun al-Rashid
 Rabiah ibn Mudhar, Jewish king of Himyar
 Abd al-Aziz ibn Musa, played a significant role in the Muslim invasion of the Iberian Peninsula; he was the son of Musa ibn Nusayr
 Musa bin Nusair (640–716), Yemeni Muslim governor and general under the Umayyads
 Dhu Nuwas (515–525), last king of the Himyarite kingdom of Yemen
 Arwa al-Sulayhi (1048–1138), Sulayhid Queen of Yemen

Contemporary figures
 Amat al-Razzak Hammed, former Minister for Social Affairs
 Mohammed Lutf al-Iryani, former Water and Environment Minister

Award winners 
 Reem Al Numery, recipient of the International Women of Courage Award.
 Hind Al-Eryani, Arab women of the year award 2017.
 Tawakkol Karman, Nobel Peace Prize award 2011.

See also
 List of people by nationality

References

Yemen
Yemenis
Yemen